Moses J. Epstein (c. 1911 – October 10, 1960) was an American lawyer and politician from New York.

Life
He was born about 1910 in New York City. He attended Public School No. 7, DeWitt Clinton High School, Long Island University and St. John's University School of Law. He was admitted to the bar in 1940.

Epstein was a Democratic member of the New York State Assembly (Bronx Co., 3rd D.) from 1957 until his death in 1960, sitting in the 171st and 172nd New York State Legislatures.

He died on October 10, 1960, while driving his car on the Franklin D. Roosevelt East River Drive, of a heart attack.

Sources

1910s births
1960 deaths
Democratic Party members of the New York State Assembly
Long Island University alumni
St. John's University School of Law alumni
20th-century American politicians
DeWitt Clinton High School alumni
Politicians from the Bronx